Pingasa griveaudi is a moth of the family Geometridae first described by Claude Herbulot in 1966. It is found on the Comoros.

Subspecies
Pingasa griveaudi griveaudi (Anjouan, Mayotte)
Pingasa griveaudi vinosa Herbulot, 1985 (Grande Comore)

References

Pseudoterpnini
Moths of the Comoros
Moths described in 1966
Taxa named by Claude Herbulot